Lazar Krstić (born 1984) is a Serbian consultant. He served as the Minister of Finance in the Government of Serbia from 2013 to 2014.

Education and early career
Krstić was born in Niš in 1984. He graduated from Yale University. After studies he worked for international management consulting firm McKinsey & Company.

Political career
Krstić was appointed as the Minister of Finance in the Government of Serbia on 26 August 2013, on the proposal of ruling Serbian Progressive Party. On 12 July 2014, he resigned from the position due to disagreements with Prime Minister of Serbia Aleksandar Vučić over the level of public sector salaries and pension reduction. During his tenure, he pushed for economic reforms, huge salaries and pension reduction, electricity price increase and other taxes for citizens.

Life after government duties
After leaving his government duties, he returned to his previous firm McKinsey & Company as consultant, and has since then been based in Geneva, Switzerland.

References

External links

1984 births
Finance ministers of Serbia
Government ministers of Serbia
Living people
Politicians from Niš
Serbian economists
Yale University alumni
McKinsey & Company people